The Women's Solo event at the 2010 South American Games had the Technical Routine on March 27 at 20:30, and the Free Routine on March 28 at 20:30.

Medalists

Results

Technical Routine

Free Routine

Summary

References
Technical Routine
Free Routine
Summary

Swimming at the 2010 South American Games